The Kalina, also known as the Caribs or mainland Caribs and by several other names, are an Indigenous people native to the northern coastal areas of South America. Today, the Kalina live largely in villages on the rivers and coasts of Venezuela, Guyana, Suriname, French Guiana, and Brazil. They speak a Cariban language known as Carib. They may be related to the Island Caribs of the Caribbean, though their languages are unrelated.

Name

The exonym Caribe was first recorded by Christopher Columbus. One hypothesis for the origin of Carib is that it means "brave warrior". Its variants, including the English Carib, were then adopted by other European languages. Early Spanish colonizers used the terms Arawak and Caribs to distinguish the peoples of the Caribbean, with Carib reserved for indigenous groups that they considered hostile and Arawak for groups that they considered friendly.

The Kalina call themselves Kalina or Karìna , spelled variously. Variants include Kali'na, Cariña, Kariña, Kalihna, Kalinya; other native names include Maraworno and Marworno. Kalina may distinguish themselves as Kali'na tilewuyu ("true Kalina"), partly to differentiate themselves from the mixed Maroon-Kalina inhabitants of Suriname. Use of "Kalina" and related variants has become common practice only recently in publications; many sources continue to use "Caribs" or associated names.

History

Lacking a written form of language before the arrival of Europeans, Kali'na history was passed down orally from one generation to the next through tales of myth and legend.

For a long time, the few Europeans studying the history of the Amerindian people of this area did not distinguish between the various Caribbean tribes. Once the period of exploration was over, interest in the study of these people diminished greatly and did not re-emerge until the end of the 20th century, when a few French expatriates, notably Gérard Collomb, became interested in the Kali'na, and the Kali'na themselves began to relate their history, in particular Félix Tiouka, president of the Association of Amerindians of French Guiana (AAGF), and his son Alexis.

For the reasons given, historical information regarding the Kali'na is rare and incomplete.

Pre-Columbian era

Making up for lack of written records, archaeologists have to date uncovered 273 Amerindian archeological sites on only 310 km² of the land recovered from the Sinnamary River by the Petit-Saut Dam. Some date back as far as two thousand years, establishing the antiquity of the Amerindian presence in this area.,

The weak historical clues available indicate that before 1492, the Kali'na inhabited the coast (from the mouth of the Amazon River to that of the Orinoco), dividing their territory with the Arawak, against whom they fought during their expansion toward the east and the Amazon River.,

They were prolific travelers even though they weren't nomads. They often traveled by land and by sea as far as the area around the Orinoco river to visit family, trade, and marry. They often went to the area surrounding the Essequibo river (now in Guyana) to collect pebbles of red porphyry (takuwa), which Kali'na women prized for polishing their pottery. The term takuwa also refers to jade, which was often traded in the Americas in general.

Colonization

The Palanakiłi arrive

In their first contact with Europeans, the Kali'na thought they were dealing with the spirits of the sea, Palanakiłi, a name they use to this day when referring to whites.

One of the first consequences of the arrival of Europeans, as in the case of many other Native American peoples, was a decrease in population due to violence inflicted by European soldiers genocide, and diseases brought over by the Europeans. The Kali'na quickly succumbed in large numbers, because their immune systems were not adapted to the viruses and bacteria of the Old World.

Amerindians in Paris

The second half of the nineteenth century saw the heyday of World's Fairs, in which European countries were displaying their wealth with colonial "villages" representing the colonized cultures. Although the World's Fairs of Paris did not have "Amerindian villages", public curiosity was such that Kali'na were sent to the capital twice - once in 1882 and again in 1892 - to be exhibited as oddities at the Jardin d'Acclimatation.,

1882

Fifteen Kali’na, all members of one family living in Sinnamary and Iracoubo, were sent to Pau:wa ("The Land of the Whites") in July 1882. Almost nothing is known about them, except their names and the fact that they were housed in huts on the lawn of the Jardin d'Acclimatation. The trip lasted four months, including three in Paris and a month's journey by boat (round trip). They were accompanied by a Creole who acted as intermediary and, presumably, interpreter. There are several portraits of them, taken by photographer Pierre Petit.

The Kali'na today
The part of South America where the Kali'na live is very sparsely populated.  However, the people of this ethnic group are such an extreme minority in all of the countries in which they are well established that locally they are a majority only in certain very secluded areas. Their current geographic distribution covers only a small fraction of their Pre-Columbian territory.

Brazil 

The Kali'nas in Brazil are localized in two groups. The Galibi do Oiapoque can only be found in São José dos Galibi, a village founded in 1950 on the right bank of the Oyapock River by several families who came from the region of the Mana River. The Galibi Marworno or Uaçá Galibi mainly live along the Uaçá River further land inwards. The main settlement is Kumarumã. The Galibi Marworno were originally from French Guiana, but mixed with the Arua and Marworno Amerindians. The term Galibi Marworno is a recent self-designation of the group.

French Guiana 
Still present in significant numbers in their original territory, the region between the Maroni and the Mana rivers (in particular, the communities of Awala-Yalimapo, the only one where they are a majority, Saint-Laurent-du-Maroni, Mana and Iracoubo), and the Amerindian village of Kourou as well as, in fewer numbers, the island of Cayenne.

Suriname 

Kali'na are a strong presence on the left bank of the Maroni River and on the banks of the Coppename River. A large proportion of the population lives in the Para District often in villages shared with the Lokono people. The main settlement are Bernharddorp, Wit-Santi, Galibi, Powakka and Bigi Ston. The Kali'na lived in the same area as the colonizers, and have a peace treaty with Suriname since 1686.  A Kali'na member of the National Assembly, Sylvia Kajoeramari, successfully led efforts to recognize the International Day of the World's Indigenous Peoples as a public holiday in Suriname.

Guyana 
In Guyana, Kali'na are stereotyped as the most "proud, aggressive, and warlike" of the Amerindian groups. Kalina were paid by plantation owners to capture indigenous slaves as well as recapture African slaves who escaped. One of the smaller indigenous groups in Guyana, Kali'na are settled on the Barama and Pomeroon Rivers, and in the Northwest of the country.

Malaria has had a detrimental impact on the population of Kalina in Guyana, and is exacerbated by hinterland mining that creates still-water pools that serve as vectors for the disease. Many Kalina are also employed in the mining sector.

Venezuela 
The country where their numbers are the greatest, Kali'na can be found in two distinct zones: in the Llanos of the Orinoco river valley and on the Cuyuni River valley part of which is in Guyana.  See also Chimire, Venezuela.

Culture 
Kasiri, a cassava-derived beer, is an important part of traditional Kalina celebrations.

For Kalina of the Guianas, the death of family members initiates a period of mourning that can last for a year or more, and is concluded with a celebration known as Epekotono. Preparations are made by a respected member of the village, and can take several months to assemble. Collecting money is a more contemporary addition to the responsibilities. Epekotono is a public event that draws attendance from neighboring villages, including body-painting, music, dancing, and symbolic burning of the deceased's belongings to mark their spirit leaving. At the conclusion, mourning ends and normal social behaviors resume, along with the option for widows to remarry. While non-Kalina can attend as guests, the event serves to reinforce the Kalina identity, marked by explicit use of the Kalina language. Nowadays, the epekotono is the only occasion for such gatherings among the Kalina.

Music
They use mostly percussion instruments. Their sanpula (or sambula) is a large drum with two skins stretched over either end of the shell by hoops pulled together with cord and is played with a mallet. They also have two kinds of maracas, called a kalawasi (or kalawashi) and a malaka.

Their flute, the kuwama, is still made but is more and more often replaced by the European flute. There is also a terra cotta horn called a kuti'

Language

They speak Kali'na, belonging to the family of Cariban languages, is today still spoken by above 10,000 people in the coastal strip that stretches from Venezuela (5,000 speakers) to Brazil (100) passing through Guyana (475), Suriname (2,500) and French Guiana (3,000 people).

Thanks to the relatively significant number of speakers, it is one of the most likely Amazonian tongues to survive. Some experiments with written transcription were undertaken in French Guiana. Linguistic standardization of a Kali'na writing system however is plagued by the diversity of the many different forms of the written language currently in use, which have been influenced by the languages of the colonists of the countries in which the Kali'na live, Spanish, Portuguese, Dutch, French and English. Thus, even as far as their ethnonym is concerned, Kali'na, there are no fewer than nine different writing systems. Kali'na therefore remains a primarily oral language.

See also
Adaheli, the Sun in the mythology of the Orinoco region
Classification of indigenous peoples of the Americas

Notes

References
 Gérard Collomb and Félix Tiouka ; Na’na Kali’na - Une histoire des Kali’na en Guyane ; Ibis Rouge Éditions, 2000 ; 
 Gérard Collomb, Félix Tiouka and M.P. Jean-Louis ; Pau:wa Itiosan:bola : Des Galibi à Paris en 1892 ; Awala-Yalimapo, December 1991
 Gérard Collomb ; Kaliña. Des Amérindiens à Paris. Photographies du prince Roland Bonaparte. ; Éditions Créaphis, Paris, 1992.
 Jean Hurault ; Français et indiens en Guyane. 1604-1972 ; Paris, 1972 ; Guyane Presse Diffusion, Cayenne, 1989.
 Jil Silberstein ; Kali’na : Une famille indienne de Guyane française ; Albin Michel, 2002 ; 
 Serge Mam Lam Fouck ; Histoire générale de la Guyane française, Cayenne, Ibis Rouge Éditions, 1996; 
 Other works of Gérard Collomb, researcher at CNRS and specialist in Kali'na culture.

Further reading
 Magaña, Edmundo et Jara, Fabiola. "The Carib sky". In: Journal de la Société des Américanistes''. Tome 68, 1982. pp. 105-132. [DOI: https://doi.org/10.3406/jsa.1982.2212] www.persee.fr/doc/jsa_0037-9174_1982_num_68_1_2212

Indigenous peoples in Brazil
Indigenous peoples in Suriname
Indigenous peoples in French Guiana
Indigenous peoples in Venezuela
Indigenous peoples of the Guianas
Indigenous peoples in Guyana